Francesco Serafino (born 17 September 1997) is an Italian footballer who plays for Brown de Adrogue, Primera Nacional Argentina.

Career
Serafino was a youth player with Boca Juniors. In 2015, he signed for Huracán in the Uruguayan Segunda División. After that, he played for Naxxar Lions (Malta) before joining Bangor City (Wales) and scored 12 goals along with 10 assists during the 2019–20 season (Season closed in early March due to the Covid-19 pandemic). Francesco also played for Sambenedettese (2020/21).
Since 1 February 2023 he has been a footballer for Brown de Adrogue, Primera Nacional Argentina.

Personal life
Francesco Serafino played as a child in various clubs in different countries to follow his father who was engaged as a musician in various countries of the world.
Reggina Calcio, Argentinos Juniors, As Roma Calcio, River Plate and Boca Juniors. As a child he played tournaments in Argentina, Spain and Italy.
Note a story related to Torino Calcio who hired him at the age of 17 but FIFA refused the membership because he came from a foreign federation as he was still a minor.
Not yet of age, he signed his first professional contract with Huracan Montevideo (Uruguay) in 2015.

References

External links 
 A tano in the B
 EXCLUSIVE - The story of Francesco Serafino, the Italian ex Boca stopped by the bureaucracy: "I would have loved to play in Napoli, the team of my father's heart..."
 Francesco Serafino, an Italian in Boca: "I am in love with these colors"

1997 births
People from Rho, Lombardy
Footballers from Lombardy
Living people
Italian footballers
Italian expatriate footballers
Expatriate footballers in Uruguay
Expatriate footballers in Malta
Expatriate footballers in Wales
Italian expatriate sportspeople in Uruguay
Italian expatriate sportspeople in Malta
Italian expatriate sportspeople in Wales
Huracán F.C. players
Naxxar Lions F.C. players
U.S. Triestina Calcio 1918 players
Rimini F.C. 1912 players
Bangor City F.C. players
A.S. Sambenedettese players
Association football midfielders
Sportspeople from the Metropolitan City of Milan